Andrew Philip King (born 29 October 1988) is a professional footballer who plays as a central midfielder for EFL Championship club Bristol City.

He spent the majority of his career with Leicester City, making 379 appearances across all competitions and scoring 62 goals. He won the League One, Championship and Premier League titles in 2009, 2014 and 2016 respectively, making him the first and only player to win the top three divisions with the same team in the Premier League era.

Born in England, King is a Wales international, qualifying through his grandfather. He made his international debut in 2009, and has gone on to earn 50 caps. He was part of the team that reached the semi-finals of UEFA Euro 2016.

Early life
King was born in Barnstaple, Devon on holiday and was brought up in Maidenhead, Berkshire. He attended Furze Platt Senior School and joined Chelsea when he was nine years old. After being released in 2004 when he was 15 years old, he joined the Leicester City youth academy.

Club career

Leicester City

Academy and early career
He was given a squad number for the 2006–07 season. During that season, King scored eight goals in 21 appearances for the Leicester academy side, which saw them win the FA Premier League Group B.

King was offered his first professional contract with Leicester on 5 May 2007. He also went on trial with Conference National team York City in August, and after playing in a pre-season friendly against Sheffield he turned down a possible loan move to the club on the advice of his agent. King made his first team debut in a 0–0 draw with Wolverhampton Wanderers on 2 October 2007, before scoring his first senior goal with a 35-yard shot described as a "rocket" in a 2–1 defeat to Southampton on 1 December. He made 11 league appearances as Leicester were relegated to League One at the end of the 2007–08 season.

2008–09 season
King's impressive start the following season earned him a new three-year contract on 21 August 2008. He scored his first goal of the season in a 3–2 League Cup defeat to Fulham on 27 August, scoring from 18 yards. He went on to score nine league goals to help Leicester secure their promotion as League One champions. His performances earned him the club's young player of the season award on 28 April 2009. He was also nominated for players' player of the season and player of the season awards, but lost out to teammates Matty Fryatt and Steve Howard. King dedicated his award to team captain Stephen Clemence, who missed the entire season through injury.

2009–10 season

During pre-season, King believed the Leicester squad was good enough to challenge for promotion. He scored his first goal of the season in a 1–0 win over Plymouth Argyle at the Walkers Stadium on 21 November 2009. Following a fine start to the 2009–10 season, King said on 23 November there is a firm belief that the team can win promotion to the Premier League. He drew praise from then-manager Nigel Pearson after scoring his fourth goal of the season in a 2–1 FA Cup win over Swansea City on 2 January 2010. His overall performance earned him the players' player of the year award on 28 April 2010 which he shared with teammate Jack Hobbs.

2010–11 season
King had his best season yet in terms of goalscoring in 2010–11, as he ended up the club's top scorer, netting 15 times in the league and 16 times in all competitions from midfield. He earned himself a four-year contract on 15 April 2011, keeping him at the club until 2015. Three days later, King's form that season was acknowledged by his fellow professionals as he was named in the Championship's PFA Team of the Year with teammate Kyle Naughton. He then took the club's players' player of the season award for the second season in a row.

2011–12 season
King began the 2011–12 season with a goal drought, scoring just one goal in his first 14 games of the season, but got back on track, netting a brace against West Ham United on 29 October 2011, the first game following Sven-Göran Eriksson's sacking as manager, before adding his fourth of the season at home to Blackpool a month later. However, the latter part of his season was disrupted due to injury. King finished the season scoring 4 times in 32 games across all competitions, King's lowest goal and appearance tally since becoming a first team regular in the 2008–09 season.

2012–13 season
King regained his form at the beginning of the following season though, scoring a goal in both the opening 2012–13 Championship fixtures against Peterborough United and Charlton Athletic respectively. King's central midfield partner often changed between Matty James and Danny Drinkwater with former forming a formidable partnership with King in the latter part of the season as Leicester attempted to get their promotion push back on track. King scored his 50th goal for Leicester on the final day of the 2012–13 season away at Nottingham Forest, a game that city won 3–2, a result that clinched 6th place and the final play-off position. King scored 7 times during the 2012–13 season in 48 games.

2013–14 season

King started the 2013–14 Championship season how he finished the last: Scoring twice in the first 8 games, both fantastic strikes against Birmingham City and Blackpool. The former was voted the Foxes goal of the month for August and the latter a show in for September's award. King's first goal of the season also marked his 250th Leicester appearance. Due to the form of Drinkwater and James, King found opportunities limited to substitute appearances. King scored his 54th goal for the Foxes in their 2–2 draw against Wigan Athletic on 1 April 2014, making him the club's highest scoring midfielder in their 130-year history as Leicester made their way to the 2013–14 Football League Championship and promotion to the Premier League.

2014–15 season

King made his Premier League debut, playing the full 90 minutes in the 2–2, opening day draw with Everton, putting in an impressive display, finishing the match with a 95.6% pass completion record. King signed a new four-year contract with the club on his 26th birthday, 29 October 2014, keeping him at the club until the summer of 2018, stating that he would love it if he spent his entire career with the Foxes. On 4 April 2015, King scored his 50th league goal for Leicester, a late winner in the 2–1 Premier League victory over West Ham United. On 29 April 2015, King made his 300th appearance for the club in the 1–3 defeat to Chelsea, the club that released him as a teenager.

2015–16 season
King started the new campaign in the Leicester team, playing the full 90 minutes as Leicester topped the Premier League table following a 4–2 win against Sunderland at the King Power Stadium on 8 August 2015, with new manager Claudio Ranieri singling out him and midfield partner Danny Drinkwater for praise. He won the league title on 2 May 2016, becoming the first player to win the top three divisions with the same club in the Premier League era; Roy Bailey, Larry Carberry, John Elsworthy, Jimmy Leadbetter and Ted Phillips having previously achieved the feat with Ipswich Town in the 1950s and 1960s.

Andy King became the fourth Welsh footballer to win the Premier League, after Ryan Giggs, Mark Hughes and Clayton Blackmore.

2016–17 season
On 29 July 2016, King signed a new four-year contract. He made his Champions League debut for Leicester on 18 October 2016, contributing in a 1–0 victory over F.C. Copenhagen at the King Power Stadium. He scored his first goal of the season in a 4–2 home win against Manchester City on 10 October 2016, his 10th consecutive season of scoring for the Foxes. He scored his second goal of the season against Derby County in the FA Cup, captaining Leicester City to a 3–1 home win.

Later years and loans
On 31 January 2018, King was sent on loan to Premier League club Swansea City until the end of the season. He scored twice for the eventually relegated Swans.

Upon his return to Leicester, King's number 10 shirt was reassigned to James Maddison, with King himself taking number 37. On 6 January 2019, King played for the first time of the season for Leicester in the FA Cup defeat against League Two side Newport County. He came on as a substitute for Matty James.

King joined Derby County on loan on 31 January 2019, signing until the end of the season. On 25 February, he suffered an ankle injury away to Nottingham Forest, and was ruled out for the rest of the season. His loan deal was cut short as a result and he returned to Leicester on 28 February.

On 15 August 2019, Rangers announced they had signed King on a season-long loan. The Scottish Premiership club cut the deal short on 5 January after just five games.

On 16 January 2020 King joined Huddersfield of the Championship on loan for the remainder of the 2019–20 season. His parent club confirmed on 18 June that he would be released at the end of the season.

OH Leuven
On 5 January 2021, King signed for Belgian First Division A side OH Leuven on a deal until the end of the season.

Bristol City
On 2 July 2021, King signed for Championship club Bristol City on a one-year deal. He scored his first goal for the club in a 2–1 loss at Middlesbrough on 14 August 2021.

International career

King qualified to play for Wales through a grandfather from Wrexham. He won caps for Wales under-19 and under-21 international, receiving his first call-up on 10 October 2007. He scored his first goal in a 5–1 UEFA European Under-21 Championship qualifying win over Luxembourg under-21 on 31 March 2009. He was in the squad that narrowly lost out to England in the play-offs for a spot at the 2009 UEFA European Under-21 Championship.

On 22 May 2009, King received his first call-up to the senior Wales squad when he was named in manager John Toshack's squad for a friendly match against Estonia. Despite naming King in the squad, Toshack admitted that he was not yet ready for international football. He made his debut as a last-minute substitute for Ched Evans in a 1–0 victory. King's first international goal came on 11 August 2010 in a 5–1 friendly victory over Luxembourg at Parc y Scarlets in Llanelli.

King was a regular in Wales' successful UEFA Euro 2016 qualifying campaign. He was given a straight red card in the 47th minute on 13 October 2014, in a home qualifier against Cyprus, for a foul on Constantinos Makrides. However Wales won 2–1, the same score at the time of the red card. Manager Chris Coleman blamed the attitude of himself and his staff for aggressively rallying the team prior to King's red card.

On 31 May 2016, King was included in Wales' 23-man squad for UEFA Euro 2016. King made his debut in the tournament as a substitute in Wales' 3–0 victory against Russia on 20 June, as Wales won Group B.

On 2 September 2017, King came on as a half time substitute to help Wales to a 1–0 victory against Austria in a 2018 FIFA World Cup qualifier. This was his 40th cap, therefore breaking Northern Irishman John O'Neill's record for most caps while a Leicester player.

Career statistics

Club

International

As of match played 11 October 2018. Wales score listed first, score column indicates score after each King goal.

Honours
Leicester City
 Premier League: 2015–16
 Football League Championship: 2013–14
 Football League One: 2008–09

Individual
 Leicester City Young Player of the Year: 2008–09
 Leicester City Player's Player of the Year: 2009–10 (joint winner), 2010–11
 PFA Team of the Year: 2010–11 Championship

References

External links

Andy King profile at the Leicester City F.C. website

1988 births
Living people
Sportspeople from Barnstaple
People from Maidenhead
Footballers from Berkshire
Footballers from Devon
English people of Welsh descent
English footballers
Welsh footballers
Association football midfielders
Leicester City F.C. players
Swansea City A.F.C. players
Derby County F.C. players
Rangers F.C. players
Huddersfield Town A.F.C. players
Oud-Heverlee Leuven players
Bristol City F.C. players
English Football League players
Premier League players
Scottish Professional Football League players
Belgian Pro League players
Wales youth international footballers
Wales under-21 international footballers
Wales international footballers
UEFA Euro 2016 players
Welsh expatriate footballers
Welsh expatriate sportspeople in Belgium
Expatriate footballers in Belgium